Daman and Diu was a former union territory in northwestern India. The territory comprised two districts, Damaon and Dio island, geographically separated by the Gulf of Khambat. The state of Gujarat and the Arabian Sea bordered the territory. A Portuguese colony since the 1500s, the territories were taken by India with the Annexation of Goa in 1961. Daman and Diu were administered as part of the union territory of Goa, Daman and Diu between 1961 and 1987, after the Goa Opinion Poll they became a separate union territory. In 2019, legislation was passed to merge the union territory of Daman and Diu with its neighbouring union territory, Dadra and Nagar Haveli, to form the new union territory of Dadra and Nagar Haveli and Daman and Diu with effect from 26 January 2020.

History 
For over 450 years, the coastal enclaves of Daman (Portuguese: Damão) and Diu on the Arabian Sea coast were part of Portuguese India, along with Goa and Dadra and Nagar Haveli. Goa, Daman and Diu were incorporated into the Republic of India on 19 December 1961, by military conquest. Portugal did not recognise the Indian annexation of these territories until the Carnation Revolution of 1974. The territory has also been ruled by Kolis.

The territory of Goa, Daman and Diu was administered as a single union territory until 30 May 1987, when Goa was granted statehood, leaving Daman and Diu as a separate union territory. Each enclave constituted one of the union territory's two districts. Daman and Diu are approximately 650 kilometres away from each other by road.

On 3 November 2019, Daman Collector Rakesh Minhas issued a Section 144 order banning peaceful assembly of four or more persons, slogan-shouting and the use of loudspeakers across the entire district and ordered the conversion of Government High School, Bhimpore and the Government Sarvottam High School, Moti Daman into 'temporary jails'. This was in response to a land ownership dispute between the local indigenous fishing community and the local administration that had confiscated their land and bulldozed their homes. The ensuing 2019 Daman Indigenous Land Clearing Protests resulted with the detention of 70 protesters in the 'temporary jails' and another 8 arrests. Few of the adivasi fisherfolk were rehoused whilst most languished traumatised and homeless on the streets near the rubble of their razed homes.

In December 2019, the Parliament of India passed legislation to merge Daman and Diu with the nearby union territory of Dadra and Nagar Haveli to create a new union territory to be known as Dadra and Nagar Haveli and Daman and Diu.

Demographics 

According to the 2011 census, Daman and Diu had a literacy rate of 87.1%, higher than the national average of 74.04%. Male and female literacy rates are 91.5 and 79.5 per cent respectively. The lowest female-to-male ratio in India (618 females per thousand males) was recorded in Daman and Diu. The Daman district, with a sex ratio of 533:1000 (F:M), is among the lowest of all the districts.

Religion

Hinduism is the most common religion in Daman and Diu. Muslims are also now the second-largest religious group in the territory, followed by the indigenous Christians. The Catholic Christians of Daman and Diu are pastorally served by the Metropolitan Roman Catholic Archdiocese of Goa and Daman, which has its see in Goa, the primatial see of India.

Languages

Gujarati was the mother tongue of most of the territory's population, as they belong to the Gujarati-speaking Damaniya sub-caste. Along with Gujarati, Hindi and English are also widely used. Daman and Diu were once part of a combined union territory along with Goa (a Konkani-speaking region) before Goa became a state in 1987.

The use of Portuguese, which was the territory's official language during the colonial period, is in decline and relegated to home use. It is also used as a liturgical language by the territory's Catholics. Standard Portuguese exists in a post-creole continuum while Daman and Diu Portuguese is spoken by about 10,000–12,000 people in Daman.

The languages taught in schools in Daman and Diu under the three-language formula were:

First language: Gujarati
Second language: Hindi
Third language: English

Administration 
According to the Constitution of India, the administration of Daman and Diu was carried out by an Administrator, appointed by the President of India as an agent of the President, not a head of state/government or a governor. He was assisted by several other officers in carrying out his duty.

Districts
The union territory of Daman and Diu had two districts:
The main settlement is the town of Diu.
The main settlement is the city of Daman.

See also 

 Battle of Diu
 Damania

References

External links 

 Daman Administration's official website
 WorldStatesmen, including lists of Portuguese captains/governors of Damão and Diu

 
1987 establishments in India
Arabian Sea
City-states
Diu, India
English-speaking countries and territories
Former Portuguese colonies
Gulf of Khambhat
Portuguese India
States and territories established in 1987
Former union territories of India
2019 disestablishments in India
Former states and territories of India
India–Portugal relations
Enclaves and exclaves